Micropholis caudata is a species of plant in the family Sapotaceae.

It is endemic to non-flooded Amazonian forest habitat, in Amazonas state of the Amazon region and northeastern Brazil.

It is a Critically endangered species on the IUCN Red List.

References

caudata
Endemic flora of Brazil
Flora of the Amazon
Environment of Amazonas (Brazilian state)
Critically endangered flora of South America
Taxonomy articles created by Polbot